This is a list of crime films released in 2002.

References

2000s
2002-related lists